Justine Moore is a British Paralympic wheelchair fencer.

Life 
Moore was born in about 1992 and she damaged her spine from a fall from a tree. In 2009 she took up fencing. In 2012 she did wheelchair fencing in Hong Kong. She was at the 2012 Summer Paralympics. In the team event she came sixth with teammates Gabi Down and Gemma Collis-McCann. She was beaten by the Hungarian Gyongyi Dani in the women's individual Épée Category B. The match was at the  Excel Arena in London. She obtained sponsorship to be at the postponed 2020 Paralympics in Tokyo.

References 

Wheelchair fencers at the 2012 Summer Paralympics
1990s births
People from Blackpool
Living people
Paralympic wheelchair fencers of Great Britain